The Secret House is a 2022 South Korean television series starring Seo Ha-jun, Lee Young-eun and Kim Jung-heon. The series, directed by Lee Min-soo and written by Won Yeong-ok for Green Snake Media, is a revenge story in which a dirt spoon lawyer chasing the traces of his missing mother walks into the secret surrounding him to fight the world. The daily drama premiered on MBC on April 11, 2022 and aired every weekday at 19:10 (KST) for 124 episodes.<ref>{{Cite news|url=https://n.news.naver.com/entertain/now/article/311/0001424709|title='비밀의 집' 서하준vs정헌, 카리스마 충돌…강렬한 시너지 예고|trans-title=House of Secrets' Seo Ha-jun vs Jung Heon, charisma clash... Strong synergy foreshadowing|author=Kim Soo-jung|work=Xsports News|publisher=Naver|date=March 24, 2022|access-date=March 25, 2022|language=ko}}</ref>

Cast and characters
Main
 Seo Ha-joon as Woo Ji-hwan 
 A dirt spoon lawyer, who has a secret to hide in the face of his family's misfortune.
 Lee Young-eun as Baek Joo-hong 
The daughter of Sang-gu and Haeng-ja. Woo Ji-hwan's first love and a bright and warm-hearted emergency medicine resident.
 Kim Jung-heon as Nam Tae-hyung
Sook-jin's son. Seoul Central District Prosecutor's Office Criminal Division 1 Prosecutor.
 Kang Byul as Nam Tae-hee 
 Sook-jin's daughter. Wide Marketing Department Manager.
 Lee Seung-yeon as Ham Sook-jin
Nam Tae-hyung and Nam Tae-hee's mother. Wide Representative. She can do anything for his son.

Supporting
Ji-hwan's house
 Yoon Bok-in as Kim Kyeong-seon 
 Ji-Hwan's mother.
 Yoon A-jung as Woo Min-young 
 Ji-hwan's older sister.
 Park Ye-rin as Woo Sol 
 Ji-hwan's daughter.
 Ahn Yong-joon as Heo Jin-ho 
 Ji-hwan's employee and assistant.

Tae-hyung's house
 Jang Hang-sun as Nam Heung-sik
 The largest building owner, and honorary chairman of Wide.
 Bang Eun-hee  as Yoo Gwang-mi
 Heung-sik's primary care nurse.
 Jo Yu-shin as Yang Man-su
 Butler of Nam Heung-sik's family.

Scarlet house
 Park Chung-sun as Baek Sang-goo
Joo-hong's father.
 Kim Nan-hee as Shim Haeng-ja  
Joo-hong's mother and Sang-goo's wife.

Production
Director Lee Min-soo and Lee Young-eun are reuniting after 12 years since MBC daily 2010 soap opera The Scarlet Letter. Lee Young-eun, herself is returning to TV series after hiatus of 3 years. She was last seen in KBS daily drama Home for Summer. Yoon A-jung and Yoon Bok-in are working together after 5 years, since the 2016-17 KBS daily drama That Sun in the Sky''.

Original soundtrack

Part 1

Part 2

Part 3

Part 4

Part 5

Viewership

Awards and nominations

Notes

References

External links
  
  The Secret House at Naver 
 The Secret House at Daum 
 

MBC TV television dramas
Korean-language television shows
2022 South Korean television series debuts
2022 South Korean television series endings
Television series about revenge
South Korean melodrama television series
South Korean romance television series
Television series by MBC C&I
Television series by Chorokbaem Media